Cacoosing is an unincorporated community in Spring Township in Berks County, Pennsylvania, United States. Cacoosing is located along State Hill Road at the crossing of Cacoosing Creek.

History
A post office called Cacoosing was established in 1878, and remained in operation until 1902. The community was named for nearby Cacoosing Creek.

References

Unincorporated communities in Berks County, Pennsylvania
Unincorporated communities in Pennsylvania